Leonardo is an unincorporated community and census-designated place (CDP) within Middletown Township, in Monmouth County, New Jersey, United States. As of the 2010 United States Census, the CDP's population was 2,757. The ZIP code for Leonardo is 07737.

History
Leonardo is named for Henry and James Leonard, the first ironmasters of New Jersey.

During World War II, the large dock complex of Naval Weapons Station Earle was built to supply ammunition to the forces.

Leonardo is known as the site of the only casualties of the US Nike Missile program.  On May 22, 1958, an Ajax missile exploded at the Nike missile base in Leonardo, killing six soldiers and four civilians.  Since the Project Nike shutdown in 1974, the Leonardo launch base, designated NY-53, has been redeveloped into single-family home sites.

Geography
Leonardo is located on the south shore of Raritan Bay. According to the United States Census Bureau, Leonardo had a total area of 0.603 square miles (1.562 km2), including 0.595 square miles (1.540 km2) of land and 0.008 square miles (0.021 km2) of water (1.38%).

Schools 
It is served by the Middletown Township Public School District.

Leonardo is home to Bayshore Middle School and Leonardo Elementary School. Bayshore Middle School has a population of 623 students and is ranked the 267th middle school out of 745 in the State of New Jersey. Leonardo Elementary school has a population of 285 students and is ranked 790th out of 1360 elementary schools in New Jersey.

Demographics

Census 2010

Census 2000
As of the 2000 United States Census there were 2,823 people, 987 households, and 753 families living in the CDP. The population density was 1,758.0/km2 (4,523.1/mi2). There were 1,017 housing units at an average density of 633.3/km2 (1,629.5/mi2). The racial makeup of the CDP was 95.85% White, 0.53% African American, 0.25% Native American, 0.50% Asian, 0.11% Pacific Islander, 0.46% from other races, and 0.89% from two or more races. Hispanic or Latino of any race were 4.85% of the population.

There were 987 households, out of which 35.9% had children under the age of 18 living with them, 61.5% were married couples living together, 10.4% had a female householder with no husband present, and 23.7% were non-families. 19.1% of all households were made up of individuals, and 4.9% had someone living alone who was 65 years of age or older. The average household size was 2.86 and the average family size was 3.31.

In the CDP the population was spread out, with 25.9% under the age of 18, 7.7% from 18 to 24, 33.3% from 25 to 44, 24.7% from 45 to 64, and 8.4% who were 65 years of age or older. The median age was 37 years. For every 100 females, there were 100.4 males. For every 100 females age 18 and over, there were 98.8 males.

The median income for a household in the CDP was $64,432, and the median income for a family was $66,750. Males had a median income of $49,716 versus $30,400 for females. The per capita income for the CDP was $23,422. About 3.4% of families and 4.1% of the population were below the poverty line, including 5.7% of those under age 18 and 3.8% of those age 65 or over.

Transportation
New Jersey Transit offers local bus service on the 834 route.

Notable people

People who were born in, residents of, or otherwise closely associated with Leonardo include:
 Donald De Lue (1897-1988), sculptor.
 Billy Devaney (born 1955), former General Manager of the St. Louis Rams.
 Bill Kunkel (1936-1985), former Major League Baseball pitcher and umpire.
 Jeff Kunkel (born 1962) former major-league shortstop.

Fictional characters associated with Leonardo:
 Jay and Silent Bob - fictional characters portrayed by Jason Mewes and Kevin Smith, respectively, in Kevin Smith's View Askewniverse (a fictional universe created and used in most films, comics and television by Kevin Smith).
 Randal Graves - a fictional character portrayed by Jeff Anderson, and Dante Hicks, Randal's friend and counterpart, played by Brian O'Halloran. Randal Graves and Dante Hicks, along with Jay and Silent Bob, are the main characters in the ViewAskewniverse, and have starred in all but three Kevin Smith films.

In media
The community is best known as the site of the Quick Stop convenience store and RST Video store (located at 58 Leonard Avenue, just north of Route 36) that was the main location for the 1994 film Clerks, directed by Kevin Smith, who worked at the store at the time. The same store was also used by Smith in his films Chasing Amy (1997), Jay and Silent Bob Strike Back (2001), Clerks II (2006) and Jay and Silent Bob Reboot (2019), and was part of a deleted scene from his film Mallrats (1995). The location was also used in Kevin Smith's short-lived television show Clerks: The Animated Series (2000), which ran for six episodes on ABC before its abrupt cancellation in mid-2000. The program's character Leonardo Leonardo (voiced by actor Alec Baldwin) was named after the town, and several of the characters resided and/or worked in Leonardo. The video store is now closed and only used for storage.

References

Census-designated places in Monmouth County, New Jersey
Middletown Township, New Jersey
Raritan Bayshore